The 1997–98 season of the NOFV-Oberliga was the fourth season of the league at tier four (IV) of the German football league system.

The NOFV-Oberliga was split into two divisions, NOFV-Oberliga Nord and NOFV-Oberliga Süd. The champions of each, SD Croatia Berlin and Dresdner SC, were directly promoted to the 1998–99 Regionalliga Nordost.

FSV Velten withdrew from the league soon after the season began.

North

South

External links 
 NOFV-Online – official website of the North-East German Football Association 

NOFV-Oberliga seasons
4
Germ